Tsiry Razafindrasata (born 14 September 1995) is a Malagasy football midfielder who currently plays for JET Kintana.

References

1995 births
Living people
Malagasy footballers
Madagascar international footballers
AS JET Mada players
JET Kintana players
Association football midfielders